Erivaldo Jorge Paulo Ferreira (born 8 February 1994), known simply as Erivaldo, is a Portuguese professional footballer who plays as a winger for Trofense. He also holds Angolan citizenship.

Club career
Born in Aveiro, Erivaldo finished his formative years at S.C. Braga. He spent his first three seasons as a senior with their reserves in the Segunda Liga, scoring his first goal there on 2 November 2013 in a 2–4 home loss against S.C. Beira-Mar.

Erivaldo played his first match in the Primeira Liga with the first team on 30 March 2014, coming on as a late substitute in the 0–1 home defeat to S.L. Benfica. After his release, and save for a brief spell in the Angolan Girabola with C.R.D. Libolo, he competed in the Portuguese second division with C.D. Feirense, C.D. Aves, Académico de Viseu F.C. and Leixões SC.

Erivaldo returned to the top tier in the summer of 2019, with C.S. Marítimo. He scored his only goal in the league on 25 July 2020 to close a 3–3 home draw with F.C. Famalicão (the last matchday), his 95th-minute strike denying the opposition qualification to the UEFA Europa League.

In the following years, Erivaldo played abroad, with PFC Beroe Stara Zagora in the First Professional Football League (Bulgaria) and FC Taraz in the Kazakhstan Premier League. He rejoined Leixões on 31 January 2022.

International career
Erivaldo earned one cap for Portugal at under-20 level, scoring in a 2–0 friendly win over Slovakia in Marinha Grande.

References

External links

1994 births
Living people
People from Aveiro, Portugal
Portuguese sportspeople of Angolan descent
Sportspeople from Aveiro District
Portuguese footballers
Association football wingers
Primeira Liga players
Liga Portugal 2 players
S.C. Braga B players
S.C. Braga players
C.D. Feirense players
C.D. Aves players
Académico de Viseu F.C. players
Leixões S.C. players
C.S. Marítimo players
C.D. Trofense players
Girabola players
C.R.D. Libolo players
First Professional Football League (Bulgaria) players
PFC Beroe Stara Zagora players
Kazakhstan Premier League players
FC Taraz players
Portugal youth international footballers
Portuguese expatriate footballers
Expatriate footballers in Bulgaria
Expatriate footballers in Kazakhstan
Portuguese expatriate sportspeople in Bulgaria
Portuguese expatriate sportspeople in Kazakhstan